Mohammad Ronak (born 15 February 1997) is an Indian cricketer. He made his Twenty20 debut on 11 January 2021, for Sikkim in the 2020–21 Syed Mushtaq Ali Trophy.

References

External links
 

1997 births
Living people
Indian cricketers
Sikkim cricketers
Place of birth missing (living people)